Qeshlaq-e Owch Ali Shahamati (also Romanized as Qeshlāq-e Owch Darreh ʿAlī Shahāmatī) is a village in Qeshlaq-e Sharqi Rural District, Qeshlaq Dasht District, Bileh Savar County, Ardabil Province, Iran. At the 2006 census, its population was 18, in 4 families.

References 

Towns and villages in Bileh Savar County